Robert Platts (21 February 1900–1975) was an English footballer who played in the Football League for Notts County.

References

1900 births
1975 deaths
English footballers
Association football forwards
English Football League players
Notts County F.C. players
Southend United F.C. players
Heanor Town F.C. players